The Fittest of the Fittest is an album by the reggae musician Burning Spear, released in 1983.

Critical reception
Trouser Press called the album "excellent," writing that "keyboard stabs, creative percussion and intriguing arrangements provide a solid background to his cries and moans of passion."

AllMusic called it "a superb album, which while not in the same class as Spear's first five releases, proves that the artist still has a good deal of simmer left."

Track listing
All tracks composed by Winston Rodney
"The Fittest of the Fittest" - 3:45
"Fire Man" - 4:10
"Bad to Worst" - 3:32
"Repatriation" - 3:43
"Old Boy Garvey" - 3:45
"2000 Years" - 4:00
"For You" - 4:04
"In Africa" - 4:04
"Vision" - 4:42

Credits
Engineered by Errol Brown
Assistant Engineer: Chris Lewis
Mixed by Winston Rodney and Errol Brown
Recorded and mixed at Tuff Gong Recording Studio, Kingston, Jamaica
Original art and design by Wicked and Wild
Original photography by Howard Liebowitz, M.D.
Original typography and inner bag design by Keith Breeded (Assorted Images) and The Printed Word

Musicians

Burning Band
Winston Rodney - vocals, percussion
Bobby Ellis - trumpet, flugelhorn
Herman Marquis - saxophone
Anthony Bradshaw - bass
Nelson Miller - drums, percussion
Michael Wilson - lead guitar, rhythm guitar
Devon Bradshaw - rhythm guitar, lead guitar
Anthony Johnson - keyboards

Additional musicians
Aston "Family Man" Barrett - bass (track 3)
Tyrone "Organ D" Downie - keyboards (track 3)
Earl "Wire" Lindo - keyboards (track 3)
Junior Marvin - guitar (track 3)
David Madden - trumpet
Glen Dacosta - saxophone
Barry Bailey - trombone
Calvin Cameron - trombone
Alvin Haughton - percussion
Winston Wright - piano, clavinet
Bobby Kalphat - organ
Robbie Lyn - organ
Peter Ashbourne - Prophet 5

References

Burning Spear albums
1983 albums
Heartbeat Records albums
EMI Records albums